The Work Experience is a British comedy series that mixes the sitcom, mock doc and prank show formats. It began on 24 October 2012 on E4. It was created by Michael Livingstone, Tom Thostrup and Claudia Webster and written by Rhodri Crooks, Tom Forbes, Livingstone, Sam Martin and Thostrup. Set in the madness of new fashion PR agency Grade PR, each week the show follows two ambitious interns as they embark on a week of tasks, tantrums and tears. However, unknown to them, the entire agency is fictional and the employees are actors.

Main cast/characters

Joanna Grade
 Played by Kate Miles
Joanna is highly-strung, self-obsessed, but most importantly, well-dressed. Having had several bites at the fashion cherry, she has decided to set up a PR agency in her own image. She is demanding, clueless and prone to disasters that are always someone else's fault. No longer in the first flush of youth and having spent twenty years fawning over a husband who left her for another man, this ice queen has decided that now is the time for her to be a mother and will stop at nothing to get herself the perfect baby.

Colby Brown
 Played by Sean Power
Chancer, sleaze and compulsive liar, Colby has spent the past twenty years creating dodgy deals and pretending to his ex-wife, Joanna, that he is gay. Colby will lie and cheat to get what he wants, using his American charm and his self-perceived sexual prowess to get around Joanna and the rest of the Grade employees. Colby is money-hungry and after an easy ride.

Shussi
 Played by Ryan Sampson
The creative tour de force behind Grade PR, Shussi is a highly sensitive artist, whose canvas is himself. He lives for fashion and feels things very deeply when they go wrong, which they do, all the time. As such he spends a lot of time crying in clothes rails, which could really smudge his eye make-up if he's not careful.

Susan Butler
 Played by Diane Morgan
Joanna's long-suffering PA, Susan, is a dowdy thirty-something that Joanna keeps around as a reminder not to let herself go. Susan bears the brunt of all of Grade PR's disasters as well as being Joanna's personal punch bag and looking after her own terminally ill mother.

Episodes

Reception
The Work Experience has received some negative reviews.
Ben Lyons of Intern Aware argues that the "cheap" series exploits the real life desperation of people chasing job "opportunities" at any cost. Caroline Mortimer of The Independent argues that the show humiliated young people looking for work.

References

External links

2012 British television series debuts
Channel 4 sitcoms
English-language television shows